Bilal Çiloğlu (born on 16 June 1998) is a Turkish judoka. He won a bronze medal in the 2018 European Championships.

References

External links
 

1998 births
Living people
Turkish male judoka
Judoka at the 2019 European Games
European Games competitors for Turkey
Judoka at the 2020 Summer Olympics
Olympic judoka of Turkey
20th-century Turkish people
21st-century Turkish people